The Pink Panther is a 1963 American comedy film directed by Blake Edwards and distributed by United Artists. It was written by Maurice Richlin and Blake Edwards. It is the first installment in The Pink Panther franchise. Its story follows inspector Jacques Clouseau as he travels from Rome to Cortina d'Ampezzo to catch a notorious jewel thief known as "The Phantom" before he is able to steal a priceless diamond known as "The Pink Panther". The film stars David Niven, Peter Sellers, Robert Wagner, Capucine and Claudia Cardinale.

The film was produced by Martin Jurow and was initially released on December 18, 1963, in Italy followed by the United States release on March 18, 1964. It grossed $10.9 million in the United States and Canada. It was positively reviewed and has an 89% approval rating based on 34 votes on Rotten Tomatoes.

In 2010, the film was selected by the Library of Congress for preservation in the United States National Film Registry, as being "culturally, historically, and aesthetically significant".

Plot
As a child in Lugash, Princess Dala receives a gift from her father, the Maharajah: the "Pink Panther", the largest diamond in the world. This huge pink gem has an unusual flaw: by looking deeply into the stone, one perceives a tiny discoloration resembling a leaping panther. Twenty years later, Dala (now played by Claudia Cardinale) has been forced into exile following her father's death and the subsequent military takeover of her country. The new government declares her precious diamond the property of the people and petitions the World Court to determine ownership. However, Dala refuses to relinquish it.

Dala goes on holiday at an exclusive ski resort in Cortina d'Ampezzo. Also staying there is English playboy Sir Charles Lytton (David Niven)—who leads a secret life as a gentleman jewel thief called "the Phantom"—and has his eyes on the Pink Panther. His brash American nephew George (Robert Wagner) arrives at the resort unexpectedly. George is really a playboy drowning in gambling debts, but poses as a recent college graduate about to enter the Peace Corps so his uncle continues to support his lavish lifestyle.

On the Phantom's trail is French police detective Inspector Jacques Clouseau (Peter Sellers), whose wife Simone (Capucine) is having an affair with Sir Charles. She has become rich by acting as a fence for the Phantom under the nose of her amorous but oblivious husband. She dodges him while trying to avoid her lover's playboy nephew, who has decided to make the seductive older woman his latest conquest. Sir Charles has grown enamored of Dala and is ambivalent about carrying out the heist. The night before their departure, George accidentally learns of his uncle's criminal activities.

During a costume party at Dala's villa in Rome, Sir Charles and his nephew separately attempt to steal the diamond, only to find it already missing from the safe. The Inspector discovers both men at the crime scene. They escape during the confusion of the evening's climactic fireworks display. A frantic car chase through the streets of Rome ensues. Sir Charles and George are both arrested after all the vehicles collide with one another in the town square.

Later, Simone informs Dala that Sir Charles wished to call off the theft and asks her to help in his defense. Dala then reveals that she stole the diamond herself, to avoid turning it over to the new government of her homeland. However, the Princess is also smitten with Sir Charles and has a plan to save him from prison. At the trial, the defense calls as their sole witness a surprised Inspector Clouseau. The barrister (John Le Mesurier) asks a series of questions that suggest Clouseau himself could be the Phantom. An unnerved Clouseau pulls out his handkerchief to wipe the perspiration from his brow, and the jewel drops from it.

As Clouseau is taken away to prison, he is mobbed by a throng of enamored women. Watching from a distance, Simone expresses regret, but Sir Charles reassures her that when the Phantom strikes again, Clouseau will be exonerated. Sir Charles invites George to join them on the Phantom's next heist in South America. Meanwhile, on the way to prison, two Carabinieri express their envy that Clouseau is now desired by so many women. They ask him with obvious admiration how he committed all of those crimes; Clouseau considers his newfound fame and replies, "Well, you know... it wasn't easy."

The film ends after the police car carrying Clouseau to prison runs over a traffic warden—the cartoon Pink Panther from the animated opening credits. He gets back up, just as the police car crashes out of view, holding a card that reads "THEND" before he swipes the letters correctly to read "THE END".

Cast

 David Niven as Sir Charles Lytton
 Peter Sellers as Inspector Jacques Clouseau
 Robert Wagner as George Lytton, Sir Charles' nephew
 Capucine as Simone Clouseau, Inspector Clouseau's wife
 Claudia Cardinale as Princess Dala
 Colin Gordon as Tucker
 Brenda de Banzie as Angela Dunning
 John Le Mesurier as Defense attorney
 James Lanphier as Saloud
 Guy Thomajan as Artoff
 Fran Jeffries as ski lodge singer
 Michael Trubshawe as Felix Townes, novelist
 Riccardo Billi as Aristotle Sarajos, Greek shipowner
 Meri Welles as Monica Fawn, Hollywood starlet
 Martin Miller as Pierre Luigi, photographer
 Gale Garnett, voice of Princess Dala (uncredited)

Cast notes
Niven portrayed "Raffles, the Amateur Cracksman", a character resembling the Phantom, in the film Raffles  in 1939.

Production
The film was "conceived as a sophisticated comedy about a charming, urbane jewel thief, Sir Charles Lytton". Peter Ustinov was "originally cast as Clouseau, with Ava Gardner as his faithless wife in league with Lytton". After Gardner backed out because The Mirisch Company would not meet her demands for a personal staff, Ustinov also left the project, and Blake Edwards then chose Sellers to replace Ustinov. Janet Leigh turned down the lead female role, as it meant being away from the United States for too long.

The film was initially intended as a vehicle for Niven, as evidenced by his top billing. As Edwards shot the film, employing multiple takes of improvised scenes, it became clear that Sellers, originally considered a supporting actor, was stealing the scenes. This resulted in his central role in all the film's sequels. When presenting at a subsequent Academy Awards ceremony, Niven requested his walk-on music be changed from the "Pink Panther" theme, stating, "That was not really my film."

The film was shot in Cortina d'Ampezzo, Rome and Rocca di Papa, Italy; Paris, France; and Los Angeles, U.S., using the Technirama process in an aspect ratio of 2.20:1. According to the DVD commentary by Blake Edwards, the chase scene at the piazza (filmed at Piazza della Repubblica in Rocca di Papa) was an homage to a similar sequence 26 minutes into Alfred Hitchcock's Foreign Correspondent (1940).

Fran Jeffries sang the song "Meglio stasera (It Had Better Be Tonight)" in a scene set around the fireplace of a ski lodge.  The song was composed by Henry Mancini, with English lyrics by Johnny Mercer and Italian lyrics by Franco Migliacci.

Reception
The movie was a popular hit, earning estimated North American rentals of $6 million.

Bosley Crowther of The New York Times wrote: "Seldom has any comedian seemed to work so persistently and hard at trying to be violently funny with weak material"; he called the script a "basically unoriginal and largely witless piece of farce carpentry that has to be pushed and heaved at stoutly in order to keep on the move." Variety was much more positive, calling the film "intensely funny" and "Sellers' razor-sharp timing ... superlative."

In a 2004 review of The Pink Panther Film Collection, a DVD collection that included The Pink Panther, The A.V. Club wrote:
Because the later movies were identified so closely with Clouseau, it's easy to forget that he was merely one in an ensemble at first, sharing screen time with Niven, Capucine, Robert Wagner and Claudia Cardinale. If not for Sellers' hilarious pratfalls, The Pink Panther could be mistaken for a luxuriant caper movie like Topkapi ... which is precisely what makes the movie so funny. It acts as the straight man, while Sellers gets to play mischief-maker.

The film holds an approval rating of 89% on the review aggregator site Rotten Tomatoes based on 35 reviews, with an average rating of 7.4/10. The website's critical consensus says: "Peter Sellers is at his virtuosically bumbling best in The Pink Panther, a sophisticated caper blessed with an unforgettably slinky score by Henry Mancini."

The American Film Institute listed The Pink Panther as No. 20 in its 100 Years of Film Scores.

Soundtrack

The soundtrack album for the film, featuring Henry Mancini's score, was released in 1964 and reached No. 8 on the Billboard magazine's pop album chart. It was nominated for Grammy and Academy Awards and was later inducted into the Grammy Hall of Fame and selected by the American Film Institute as one of the greatest film scores.

See also
 List of American films of 1963
 The Pink Panther (series)

References

Further reading

External links

 
 
 
 
 

1963 films
1960s heist films
American heist films
1960s English-language films
Films directed by Blake Edwards
Films scored by Henry Mancini
Films set in Italy
Films set in a fictional country
Films shot in Italy
1960s French-language films
1960s German-language films
Grammy Hall of Fame Award recipients
1960s Italian-language films
The Pink Panther films
United Artists films
United States National Film Registry films
1960s police comedy films
Films with screenplays by Blake Edwards
1963 comedy films
Films about jewellery
American films with live action and animation
1960s American films
1960s British films